Too Young the Hero is a 1988 American made-for-television historical drama war film directed by Buzz Kulik and starring Rick Schroder.  It premiered on CBS on March 27, 1988.  The film tells the true story of a 12-year-old boy who forges his mother's signature to join the United States Navy during World War II. It is based on the real life of Calvin Graham, who was the youngest American serviceman of the war. The film was produced by Trucon Productions in Virginia Beach, Virginia and in Wilmington, North Carolina for CBS.

Plot
Calvin Graham (Ricky Schroder), a 12-year-old boy who looks older than his age, shows up at a naval base in uniform with a set of sealed orders. After his orders are reviewed, he is arrested (without explanation) and taken to the brig.

Graham unsuccessfully tries to get himself released from prison by saying he is underage, but nobody believes him.  He then learns that he's in prison for desertion and, as a result, is unable to get any messages out.

When Graham is asked about a wound in the back of his head, he remembers the USS South Dakota fighting in the Naval Battle of Guadalcanal.  One of Graham's shipmates is killed, and several others, including Graham, are wounded.  Lauding Graham's bravery, the ship's captain recommends him for two Purple Hearts.  Graham's ship enters port in New York City for repairs, but when Graham learns that his grandmother has died, he asks to go to Texas to attend her funeral.  The ship's executive officer, who has assumed command, gives Graham a four-day pass, knowing he cannot make it back in time.  He tells Graham to go to the recruiting office in Texas and turn himself in when the pass expires.  Graham reports as directed, expecting his story about being underage to be verified so he can be released.  However, as depicted in the opening scenes, he is arrested instead.

Graham spends his 13th birthday being nearly worked to death by abusive guards who refuse to believe him.  Meanwhile, his sister receives an anonymous phone call telling her that Graham is in the brig.  After pleading with the Provost Marshal gets her nowhere, she goes to the newspaper, which finally gets her brother released.  As Graham is reunited with his sister, the viewers learn that in 1978, Graham's medals were restored and he was given an honorable discharge, while his veteran's benefits were still pending (as of the date of the film).

Cast
 Ricky Schroder as Calvin Graham
 R. Pickett Bugg as Pico
 Jon DeVries as Captain Thomas Gatch
 Rick Warner as Holbrook
 Mary-Louise Parker as Pearl Spencer
 Debra Mooney as Calvin's mother
 Ron Shelley as Cracker
 Christopher Dioni as Avila
 Carl Mueller as Sargent Shriver
 Tom Wood as Cluff
 Christopher Curry as Laslo

References

External links
 
 

Calvin Graham’s memorial at findagrave
 https://www.findagrave.com/memorial/10667014/calvin-leon-graham

1988 television films
1988 films
American biographical films
American war films
CBS network films
Films about the United States Navy in World War II
Films directed by Buzz Kulik
Films scored by Steve Dorff
World War II films based on actual events
1980s American films